Corin Braga is a Romanian scholar and prose writer. He is a university professor in comparative literature and the Dean of the Faculty of Letters at the Babes-Bolyai University. He is also the director of Phantasma, the Center for Imagination Studies in Cluj-Napoca, and of the academic journal Caietele Echinox. He is a correspondent member of the Academia Nacional de Ciencias de Buenos Aires, Argentina, the vice-president of the Romanian Association of General and Comparative Literature and the vice-president of the Centre de Recherches Internationales sur l’Imaginaire.

Braga's most famous work is Noctambulli, a series of four novels written in Oniric style of writing, which is a writing technique introduced by the Romanian Onirist writers in the 1960s. Three books in the series, Claustrofobul, Hidra, and Luiza Textoris were published in 1992, 1996 and 2012 respectively. The fourth book of the series is slated for a 2019 release. He has also written two journals of dreams, Oniria (1985-1995), in 1999, and Acedia.(1998-2007), in 2014. The latter received critical acclaim and won Great Prize at FestLit (National Festival of Literature) Cluj.

Braga is also known for his work in European comparative literature on the topic of the failed quest of literary characters to find Paradise, Utopia or other sacred places on Earth, on which he has written five books.

Education and early career 
Braga was born in 1961 in Baia Mare, Romania. He received a degree in Romanian and Spanish language and literature from the Babes-Bolyai University in Cluj-Napoca in 1985. He started teaching Romanian language and literature at the Andrei Mureșanu High School in Bistrița, and taught there until 1988, when he started working as a literary consultant for the Radu Stanca National Theatre in Sibiu.

In 1990, he left his job at the Radu Stanca theatre and began PhD in Literature from the Babes-Bolyai University. At the same time he started research at the Institute of Linguistic and Literary History in Cluj. His work there contributed to the production of a Chronological Dictionary of the Romanian Novel. In 1993, Braga became assistant professor in comparative literature at the Babes-Bolyai University. Later in 1993, he became the director of the Echinox Cultural Review and worked there until the beginning of 2000. In 1997, he completed his PhD.

Later career 
Braga continued teaching at the Babes-Bolyai University as associate professor and then full professor. In 2001, he founded Caietele Echinox and, in 2002, he founded Phantasma - The Center for Imagination Studies at the Faculty of Letters. In 2000, he began a second PhD in Philosophy from the Jean Moulin University in France and received the degree in 2008. He became the Dean of Faculty of Letters at the Babes-Bolyai University in 2008.

Since 1996, Braga has contributed to the production of the Analytical Dictionary of Romanian Literary Works and, since 1998, he has contributed to the Dictionary of Romanian Writers. He was appointed as the vice-president of Association of General and Comparative Literature of Romania in 2011 and as the vice-president of the Centre de Recherches Internationales sur l’Imaginaire (CRI2i) in 2012.

Braga has published 11 volumes of essays in Romanian as well as in French, 5 volumes of prose and over 300 papers. He is the director of the academic journals Studia Universitatis Babes-Bolyai Series Philologia and Caietele Echinox. He is a member of the advisory boards of the Collection Caffé dei filosofi, Mimesis Edizioni, Italy; Collection Danubiana. Immagini e libri dalla Romania, Aracné Edizioni, Italy; and Collection icovidivoci, Artetetra Edizioni, Italy.

Books and volumes

Noctambulii 
In 1992, Braga published the first book in the series Noctambulii, which translates to Night-Walkers, indicating the oneiric tone of the novels. The plot of all the novels is not dictated by logic, but by magic and dreaming. The first book, Claustrofobul tells the story of Anir Margus, a young geologist, who is entrusted with the job of stopping water deep in the layers of soil from flooding a town named Clusium. Anir manages to send the rising water into deeper layers of the soil, and he is elected ruler of the town, replacing Holom, the former president. However, the absorption of the water provokes a hole in the ground, crumbling of buildings and landslides. Through the manipulation of Holom, Anir is removed by a public upheaval and executed in a fountain monument. A sequel to the Claustrofobul, entitled Hidra, was published in 1996. Hidra tells the story of Adela Vlaia, Anir's fiancé, who after his execution throws herself in the water monument. However, instead of dying, she dives into another underground world, parallel to Clusium. She travels across this world to find Anir and while doing so, she lives her life in reverse order.

The third book in the series, Luiza Textoris, was published in 2012. Luiza Textoris reverses the perspective of the first two novels. The main character of the story, Luiza, is a teenage girl who dreams so much that she begins to loose the sense of reality and starts living psychotic delirium episodes. In order to help her, her boyfriend, Fulviu Friator, who practices yoga and meditation, teaches her how to create a dream-double, an alternative personality emerging in dreams in order to relieve the original of experiencing traumatic nocturnal episodes. Luiza and Fulviu start dreaming together. In the dream world, Anir and Adela, the characters of the first two novels, appear to be the dream doubles of Luiza and Fulviu, which connects the story of the four. In a review about Luiza Textoris, Echinox Magazine wrote that "although, in a first reading, the novel is overcrowded and confused, and some events seem to be not logically linked or difficult to justify, it must always be remembered that we are dealing with a well-built oniric novel; not everything has to make sense from the beginning and the overall atmosphere that it has to leave is that of a dream, of a logic behind the usual logic."

The fourth novel, Ventrilocul (to be published in 2019), will be focused on Fulviu Friator, presenting his life before and after meeting Luiza Textoris.

Failed quests of paradise 
Braga has written several volumes in French about the literary theme of the quest for finding paradise. Two of these volumes are dedicated to the topic of the Paradise lost in European medieval literature. In the first volume, Le Paradis Interdit au Moyen Âge. I. La Quête Manquée de l’Éden Oriental, published in 2004, he studies the genesis of the myth of the Garden of Eden and various Christian versions of the failed quest of a divine garden prohibited after the original sin. In the second volume, Le Paradis Interdit au Moyen Âge. II. La Quête Manquée de l’Avalon Occidentale, published in 2006, he analyses a complementary corpus of legends, based on Celtic, especially Irish mythology. Reviewing the second volume in Revue de l'histoire des Religions, Anna Caiozzo, wrote that "the author's approach is a true synthesis of all the myths that have presided over the construction of an image of paradise on the eastern borders of the world as places both eschatological and promises of personal fulfillment."

Du Paradis Perdu à l’Antiutopie aux XVIi-XVIII Siècles, which was published in 2010, was his next work on the topic. In it, Braga continued the analysis of the failed quests during the Renaissance era. He showed that Thomas More opened a new tradition, in which the Garden of God was supplemented by the City of Man. Utopia became thus a successor of the Terrestrial Paradise and of the Golden Age. In 2012, Braga wrote Les Antiutopies Classiques, in which he revisited the concept of utopia and utopianism, but this time "in terms of its most inauspicious feature: the destructive side of a literary imaginary society."

In a fifth volume, entitled Pour Une Morphologie du Genre Utopique, published in 2018, Braga complements the historical investigation with a paradigmatic approach of the Utopian genre. Starting from the theory of possible worlds, he makes a typological distinction between four classes of utopias: outopias, eutopias, dystopias and antiutopias.

Hermeneutics and literary theory 
In literary theory and hermeneutics, Braga focuses on concepts such as imagination studies (“recherches sur l’imaginaire”), human universals and archetypes, and has coined paired concepts such as anarchetype and eschatype. In the book 10 Studii de Arhetipologie, he made the distinction between three definitions of the concept of archetype (ontological, psychological and cultural), which can be used as bases for multidisciplinary hermeneutics in literary analyses.

In De la Arhetip la Anarhetip (2006), Braga defined the "anarchetype" as a different pattern for cultural, religious, literary and art works, alternative to the concept of archetype (or human universal). Reviewing the book, Andrea Cornea wrote in Idei in dialog that "the chapters dedicated to the premodern cartographic imaginary are not only charming and full of substance, but also written with an admirable competence, understanding and adequacy that makes them highly recommendable to anyone studying medieval or Renaissance imagery, and generally to anyone who wants to understand how it worked the European collective imaginary.

Awards 
1993 - Award for debut in literary criticism, at the National Book Fair, Cluj
2005 - Henri Jacquier Award, by the Romanian Writers Association, Cluj
2005 -	Award of the Romanian Association of General and Comparative Literature
2007 - Award for Literary Criticism  by the Romanian Writers Association
2007 - National Prize for Literary History and Criticism ”Petru Creţia”, Memorialul Ipoteşti
2009 - Chevalier de l’Ordre des Palmes Académiques, France
2012 - Award for Literary Criticism by the Romanian Writers Association, Cluj
2014 - Prose Award by Tiuk! literary review
2015 - Great Prize at FestLit (National Festival of Literatură), Cluj 
2015 - "Ion Hobana" Award by the Romanian Writers Association, Bucharest
2017 - Prize ”I. Negoițescu” of the Apostrof cultural review, for opera omnia, Cluj

Bibliography

Noctambulii 
Noctambulii (Night-Walkers). I. Claustrofobul [Claustrophobus] (1992) 
II.Hidra [Hydra]. (1996) 
III.Luiza Textoris. (2012)

Quest of Paradise 
Le Paradis Interdit au Moyen Âge. I. La Quête Manquée de l’Eden Oriental. (2004)
Le Paradis Interdit au Moyen Âge. II. La Quête Manquée de l’Avalon Occidentale. (2006)
Du Paradis Perdu à l’Antiutopie aux XVI-XVIII siècles. (2010)
Les Antiutopies Classiques. (2012)
Pour Une Morphologie du Genre Utopique. (2018)

Other volumes 
Nichita Stănescu - Orizontul Imaginar [The Imaginary Horizon of Nichita Stănescu]. (1993)
Lucian Blaga. Geneza Lumilor Imaginare [The Genesis of Lucian Blaga's Fictional Worlds]. (1998)
Oniria. Jurnal de Vise (1985-1995) [Oniria. Dream Diary]. (1999)
10 Studii de Arhetipologie [10 Studies in Archetypology]. (1999)
De la Arhetip la Anarhetip [From Archetype to Anarchetype]. (2006)
Concepte şi Metode în Cercetarea Imaginarului. [Concepts and Methods in the Study of the Imagination]. (2007)Psihobiografii [Psycho-biographies]. (2011)Acedia. Jurnal de Vise (1998-2007) [Acedia. Dream Diary]. (2014)Morfologia Lumilor Posibile. Utopie, Antiutopie, Science-fiction, Fantasy [The Morphology of Possible Worlds. Utopia, Dystopia, Science-Fiction, Fantasy]. (2015)

 Translated volumes 
Wilfred R. Bion, Second Thoughts. Selected Essays on Psycho-Analysis, Translated from the English by Carmen Bujdei and Florin V. Vlădescu, in collaboration with Corin Braga, Sigmund Freud Publishing House, New York, 1993
Andrew Samuels, Bani Shorter and Fred Plaut, A Critical Dictionary of Jungian Analysis, Translated from the English by Corin Braga, Sigmund Freud Publishing House, New York, 1995; 2nd edition, Humanitas, Bucarest, 2005
Gilbert Durand, An Introduction to Mythodology. Myths and Societies, Translated from the French by Corin Braga, Dacia Publishing House, Cluj, 2005
Philippe Walter, Limba păsărilor'' [The Language of the Birds], În româneşte de Andreea Hopârtean şi Corin Braga, Cluj, Dacia, Colecţia ”Mundus imaginalis”, 2007

References 

Postmodern writers
Romanian literary critics
21st-century Romanian historians
Living people
1961 births